Trachelocercidae is a family of ciliates in the class Karyorelictea.

Systematics 
Trachelocercidae is the largest family within the Karyorelictea with about 70 nominal species so far described.

Description 
Trachelocercids usually have an elongated body, which may be divided into head, neck, trunk and tail regions, an apical oral cavity, and most have several macronuclei and micronuclei arranged in nuclear groups

References 

Karyorelictea